The UNESCO 1970 Convention on the Means of Prohibiting and Preventing the Illicit Import, Export and Transfer of Ownership of Cultural Property is an international treaty. The treaty, signed to combat the illegal trade in cultural items, was signed on 14 November 1970, and came into effect on 24 April 1972. , 142 states have ratified the treaty.

History 
Before the 1970 UNESCO convention, the illegal trade of antique objects and cultural items was prevalent among the trade of drugs and weapons. Therefore, several sovereign states set about to preserve important historical and culturally significant objects. These actions were a prelude to UNESCO's wide-scale attempt on the manners of preserving cultural objects.

The conception of the treaty began in April 1964, when UNESCO appointed a Committee of Experts from thirty states in April 1964. In 1968, UNESCO adopted Resolution 3.334, authorizing the creation of a committee to draft a convention. The UNESCO Director-General appointed a principal expert and four consultants to draft the text on the convention, for later review by each member state. Upon its revision, the text was sent to a Special Committee of Governmental Experts, which prepared a final draft around April 1970.

The Committee was attended by 61 states, and the Convention drafted by the Committee was adopted at the 16th General Conference on 14 November 1970. The turning point was the decision by the United States to support international cooperation to preserve the cultural heritage of mankind from pillage of cultural property, including import controls relating to looted archeological and ethnological properties. The text adopted by the 
Committee was a compromise between the comprehensive Secretariat draft and proposals tabled by the United States delegation. Oral History, Mark B. Feldman, Association for Diplomatic studies and Training at p.44, https://adst.org/OH%20TOCs/Feldman.Mark.pdf; Report, U.S. Delegation to the Special Committee of Government Experts to Examine the Draft Convention on the Means of Prohibiting and Preventing the Illicit Import, Export and
Transfer of Ownership of Cultural Property, UNESCO House, Paris, France (Apr. 13-24, 1970);Paul Bator, Essay on the International Trade in Art, 34 Stanford Law Review 275 (1982).

Details 
Under the 1970 Convention, cultural property is under protection. Cultural property includes anything of scientific, historical, artistic, and or religious significance, as defined by Article I of the convention. However, every state can define its own cultural property, as long as it is an item of importance and within the categories defined in Article I.

The Convention recommends the enforcement of the protection of cultural property in "three main pillars", each being preventive measures, restitution provisions, and international cooperation. The first pillar, preventive measures, states that those signed to the treaty are to enforce the security and safety of cultural property, such as taking inventory, exportation certifications, monitoring of trade, and imposition of penal sanctions. The second pillar, restitution provisions, states that each sovereign state is to assist one another in the recuperation of stolen cultural property. The third pillar, international cooperation, is an attempt by the convention to strengthen international ties between signatories, and to provide assistance and cooperation with one another.

Finally, under the convention, any party may seek the recovery and assistance of another state for the recovery of stolen or illegally exported cultural property imported into another state party, albeit only after the enforcement of the Convention in both states. However, the import or export of any cultural property is not legitimized, and can still fall under the terms of the convention.

Statutory bodies 
Under the Convention, several statutory bodies have been created to oversee the execution of the treaty's goals.

Meeting of States Parties 
The Meeting of the States Parties to the 1970 Convention is the sovereign body of the convention. Made up of all the parties that are signed to the 1970 convention, this body organizes strategies and plans of action for the implementation of the convention. They met for the fourth time in May 2017.

Subsidiary Committee 
The Subsidiary Committee of the Meeting of States Parties to the 1970 Convention is a statutory body of the 1970 Convention, made of 18 members from the states signed to the convention on 4-year terms, which are controlled by the Meeting of States Parties.
Its main functions are to not only promote the convention, but to review and inform the Meeting of States Parties, and to identify key problems in the Convention.

UNESCO Secretariat to the 1970 Convention 

The UNESCO Secretariat of the 1970 Convention assists the Meetings of States Parties by organizing meetings for the Meetings of States Parties and other statutory branches of the convention and assisting in the development of resources and materials regarding the convention.

UNESCO Intergovernmental Committee 
The UNESCO Intergovernmental Committee for Promoting the Return of Cultural Property to its Countries of Origin or its Restitution in Case of Illicit Appropriation (ICPRCP), or UNESCO Intergovernmental Committee, was created to provide assistance in the recuperation of cultural property. Every two years, half of its 22 members are elected for 4 year terms. As an advisory body, this committee serves the direct assistance in the retrieval of property stolen via illicit trade. It also serves as a possible place for dispute resolution.

The Intergovernmental Committee also manages the International Fund for the Return of Cultural Property to its Countries of Origin or its Restitution in Case of Illicit Appropriation.

UNIDROIT Convention on Stolen or Illegally Exported Cultural Objects 
Under UNESCO's request, UNIDROIT drafted the UNIDROIT Convention on Stolen or Illegally exported Cultural Objects. It serves as a body of private law for the international art trade to assist the efforts of the 1970 convention, which it reinforces with legal rules. It seeks to end technical problems resulting from different laws in different states, and to contribute in the effort against illegal trade of cultural items.

Key partners 
Several agencies and organizations have assisted the 1970 Convention, including:
 European Union
 International Council of Museums
 Interpol – Works of Art Unit
 UNIDROIT  
 The United Nations Office on Drugs and Crime (UNODC)  
 The World Customs Organization (WCO)

Non-governmental organizations 
The International Council of Museums (ICOM)

Logo 
The 1970 Convention consists of two images; a hand superimposed upon a vase. It is meant to represent the end (hand) of the illegal trade of cultural items (vase).

See also 
Art repatriation
International Institute for the Unification of Private Law

References

External links 
Illicit Trafficking of Cultural Property, UNESCO (official website)
 Official text of the 1970 Convention (in full)

UNESCO treaties
1970 in France
Treaties concluded in 1970
Treaties entered into force in 1972
Art and culture treaties
Art and cultural repatriation after World War II
International cultural heritage documents
Treaties of Afghanistan
Treaties of Albania
Treaties of Algeria
Treaties of the People's Republic of Angola
Treaties of Argentina
Treaties of Armenia
Treaties of Australia
Treaties of Austria
Treaties of Azerbaijan
Treaties of the Bahamas
Treaties of Bahrain
Treaties of Bangladesh
Treaties of Barbados
Treaties of the Byelorussian Soviet Socialist Republic
Treaties of Belgium
Treaties of Belize
Treaties of Benin
Treaties of Bhutan
Treaties of Bolivia
Treaties of Bosnia and Herzegovina
Treaties of Botswana
Treaties of the military dictatorship in Brazil
Treaties of the People's Republic of Bulgaria
Treaties of Burkina Faso
Treaties of Myanmar
Treaties of the Khmer Republic
Treaties of Cameroon
Treaties of Canada
Treaties of the Central African Republic
Treaties of Chad
Treaties of Chile
Treaties of the People's Republic of China
Treaties of Colombia
Treaties of Costa Rica
Treaties of Ivory Coast
Treaties of Croatia
Treaties of Cuba
Treaties of Cyprus
Treaties of the Czech Republic
Treaties of Czechoslovakia
Treaties of North Korea
Treaties of Zaire
Treaties of Denmark
Treaties of Djibouti
Treaties of the Dominican Republic
Treaties of Ecuador
Treaties of Egypt
Treaties of El Salvador
Treaties of Equatorial Guinea
Treaties of Estonia
Treaties of Ethiopia
Treaties of Finland
Treaties of France
Treaties of Gabon
Treaties of Georgia (country)
Treaties of Germany
Treaties of Ghana
Treaties of Greece
Treaties of Grenada
Treaties of Guatemala
Treaties of Guinea
Treaties of Haiti
Treaties of Honduras
Treaties of the Hungarian People's Republic
Treaties of Iceland
Treaties of India
Treaties of Pahlavi Iran
Treaties of Ba'athist Iraq
Treaties of Italy
Treaties of Japan
Treaties of Jordan
Treaties of Kazakhstan
Treaties of Kuwait
Treaties of Kyrgyzstan
Treaties of Laos
Treaties of Lebanon
Treaties of the Libyan Arab Republic
Treaties of Lithuania
Treaties of Luxembourg
Treaties of Madagascar
Treaties of Mali
Treaties of Mauritania
Treaties of Mauritius
Treaties of Mexico
Treaties of Monaco
Treaties of the Mongolian People's Republic
Treaties of Montenegro
Treaties of Morocco
Treaties of Nepal
Treaties of the Netherlands
Treaties of New Zealand
Treaties of Nicaragua
Treaties of Niger
Treaties of Nigeria
Treaties of Norway
Treaties of Oman
Treaties of Pakistan
Treaties of the State of Palestine
Treaties of Panama
Treaties of Paraguay
Treaties of Peru
Treaties of the Polish People's Republic
Treaties of Portugal
Treaties of Qatar
Treaties of South Korea
Treaties of Moldova
Treaties of Romania
Treaties of the Soviet Union
Treaties of Rwanda
Treaties of Saudi Arabia
Treaties of Senegal
Treaties of Serbia and Montenegro
Treaties of Seychelles
Treaties of Slovakia
Treaties of Slovenia
Treaties of South Africa
Treaties of Spain
Treaties of Sri Lanka
Treaties of Eswatini
Treaties of Sweden
Treaties of Switzerland
Treaties of Syria
Treaties of Tajikistan
Treaties of North Macedonia
Treaties of Tunisia
Treaties of Turkey
Treaties of the Ukrainian Soviet Socialist Republic
Treaties of the United Kingdom
Treaties of Tanzania
Treaties of the United Arab Emirates
Treaties of the United States
Treaties of Uruguay
Treaties of Uzbekistan
Treaties of Venezuela
Treaties of Vietnam
Treaties of Yugoslavia
Treaties of Zambia
Treaties of Zimbabwe
Treaties extended to Greenland
Treaties extended to the Faroe Islands
Treaties extended to Bouvet Island
Treaties extended to Peter I Island
Treaties extended to Queen Maud Land